Mikkeli is a town and municipality in Finland. It is located in what used to be the province of Eastern Finland and is part of the Etelä-Savo region. The population density is  The town is located on lake Saimaa. Together with Savonlinna, it is one of the largest towns in the South Savonia region and one of the concentrations in the region's hospital districts.

Mikkeli was the site for the headquarters of the Finnish armed forces during World War II. In recognition of this, the town's coat of arms incorporates a pair of crossed Marshal Mannerheim's batons, and the town was awarded the Cross of Liberty, 4th class, to be displayed with the coat of arms.

History
The earliest signs of human life in Mikkeli are the Astuvansalmi rock paintings in Ristiina, dating back to 4000-2200 BCE. The Astuvansalmi is the largest rock painting site in the Nordic countries.

The peace treaty of Nöteborg in 1323, with which the Pogosta (church parish) of Savilahti was transferred from the control of Novgorod to Sweden, is the oldest written record of the settlement in the present region of Mikkeli. The locality received its present name Mikkeli after Archangel Michael by the early 16th century at the latest.

On 23 January 1597 more than 200 peasant rebels were killed in the parsonage of Kenkävero in part of the larger Cudgel War.
In the war waged by King Gustav III of Sweden against Russia 1788–1790, a battle took place at Porrassalmi Strait, a few miles south of Mikkeli, on 13 June 1789. In the battle the Swedes (the Finns) victoriously defended their positions against superior numbers of Russians.

Mikkeli was granted town rights in 1838.  The provincial government of the province of Mikkeli that had been established in 1831, moved from Heinola to Mikkeli in 1843.

In 1918 during the Civil War, the headquarters of the White Army were established in Mikkeli. Mikkeli was located in a conservative farming area and it was a White stronghold. But elements of the Russian army garrison in the area supported the Reds.
During the Winter War and Continuation War, the headquarters of the Finnish Army was located in Mikkeli. The Army staff made their base in a local secondary school. At the site of that school is the small Headquarters Museum (Päämajamuseo) containing photographs and memorabilia of the era.  Because the headquarters of the army was based there, Mikkeli was bombed heavily. But since there was almost no "high-rise" development at that time, the damage was quickly repaired. Architecturally most of prewar Mikkeli doesn't exist anymore.

Wartime Mikkeli is identified with Marshal C. G. E. Mannerheim, the supreme commander of the Finnish Defence Forces and later President of Finland. His personal railway carriage, which he used as a command post during the war, is parked in a siding at Mikkeli station. It is possible to look inside the carriage through its windows at any time. But public entry to the carriage is permitted only once a year, on Mannerheim's birthday (4 June). The carriage was the venue of Mannerheim's famous 1942 meeting (near Immola) with Hitler, on which occasion a private conversation between the two men was secretly recorded. Photographs of this meeting are on display in the carriage. Mannerheim was a regular diner at the Mikkelin Klubi, where his favourite drink was schnapps.

One of the main museums in the town is the Infantry Museum (Jalkaväkimuseo) located in one of the former army barracks, close to the University of Applied Sciences. It contains exhibits from the four wars in Finland's modern history – the Civil, Winter, Continuation and Lapland Wars. The museum also contains an exhibit dedicated to Finnish war hero Lauri Törni.

In 1986, there was a hostage crisis in Mikkeli, when a bank robber drove from Helsinki to Mikkeli with three hostages and parked there. When the police shot at the hostage taker's car, he exploded the car, killing himself and one hostage.

In 1997 there was a province reform, which made Mikkeli the capital of the new province of Eastern Finland. In a separate reform, the rural municipality of Mikkeli which had surrounded the town and the municipality of Anttola were consolidated to Mikkeli in the beginning of the year 2001. The municipality of Haukivuori was consolidated with Mikkeli on 1 January 2007 and Ristiina and Suomenniemi in 2013.

Geography

The centre of Mikkeli is located on a low rise, near the shore of a bay of Lake Saimaa. There are several small lakes in and around the town. The lakes of the eastern parts of the town belong to the water system of River Vuoksi. In the west the town reaches Lake Puula that belongs to the water system of River Kymijoki.

Demographics

The municipality is unilingually Finnish (only  of Mikkelians speak Swedish as their first language).

Education 

A central campus of South-Eastern Finland University of Applied Sciences (Xamk) is located in Mikkeli and it is a major employer in the city. Its history goes back to 1965, when Mikkeli was selected as the site for a new higher education college specializing in professional, engineering and vocational studies. The new polytechnic received its first intake of students in 1969. It was originally housed in an old Russian army barracks on the outskirts of town. Purpose-built accommodation has since been added, but the old buildings are still in use. For example, the student union is located in the "Officers' Club" building. The Polytechnic changed its name to Mikkeli University of Applied Sciences in 2006 and merged in the beginning of 2017 with Kymenlaakso University of Applied Sciences to constitute a new university: South-Eastern Finland University of Applied Sciences (Xamk).

Several other universities also have operations in Mikkeli. The Mikkeli University Consortium includes units from University of Helsinki, Aalto University (formerly Helsinki School of Economics), University of Eastern Finland and Lappeenranta University of Technology. Aalto offers a highly ranked Bachelor of Science degree in international business, taught in English, which draws students and faculty from around the world.

Traffic

Mikkeli has a fast road connection to capital area Greater Helsinki through Finnish national road 5 and Finnish national road 4, which is a four lane highway. Mikkeli has a railway station on the Savonia railway with five trains to and from Helsinki, daily. There are also bus connections to neighboring cities and municipalities and a small local bus transit network within the city limits. Mikkeli also has its own airport, which however has had no scheduled commercial flights since 2005.

Culture
Mikkeli boasts its own concert hall, which is a world class facility, built in 1988 to commemorate Mikkeli's 150th anniversary as a town. The concert hall is the home of St. Michel Strings chamber orchestra, and also provides the main venue for the annual Mikkeli International Music Festival, which attracts musicians and audiences from across Europe. For example, Mariinsky Opera led by Valery Gergiev performs there regularly.

Tourism 

Mikkeli is a major holiday resort within the Finnish lakeland area. A well-known and popular travel centre and theme park Visulahti is in Mikkeli, located in the shores of Lake Saimaa. Mikkeli is a popular area for summerhouses due to its vast amount of lakes, in 2020 there were over 10 000 summer houses in Mikkeli, the second most in Finland increasing the population during the summer months. A Major part of tourism is based on nature and especially lakes.

Due to Mikkeli's role as the headquarter city in the World War II, the town has several museums dedicated to that period of time such as, the Infantry museum, the Lokki Communications Center, and the Headquarters museum.

The annual trotting event St Michel ravit is Mikkeli's largest event with approximately 20 000 spectators.

Hotels are concentrated in the center of Mikkeli. In other areas there are rental cottages scattered in the smaller villages and countryside.

Sport
Jukurit is an ice hockey team from Mikkeli, which competes in the Finnish premier league, Liiga. The team has won six Mestis (second highest league) championships (2001, 2002, 2003, 2006, 2013 and 2015).

Mikkelin Kampparit plays in the highest bandy division. In 2012, they became Finnish champions for the first time.

Mikkeli has two major football teams, Mikkelin Palloilijat (MP) and Mikkelin Pallo-Kissat (MiPK). Both of them have played in the Finnish premier league, currently MP is playing on the second highest level and MiPK on the third highest. The former EU commissioner Olli Rehn used to play for MP for 13 years (youth teams 1968–78, first team 1979–82).

Notable people

Jalo Autonen
Manuela Bosco
Jussi Jääskeläinen
Jari Ketomaa
Harri Kirvesniemi
Mikko Kolehmainen 
Olli Kolehmainen 
Shefki Kuqi
Erkki Liikanen 
Otto Manninen
Mikko Tarmia
Arja Saijonmaa
Olli Rehn

International relations

Twin towns and sister cities
Mikkeli is twinned with:

References

External links

 Town of Mikkeli – Official website
 
 University of applied sciences website
 YouTube picture gallery of Mikkeli
 Mikkeli Region Travel Services

 
1838 establishments in Finland
Cities and towns in Finland
Grand Duchy of Finland
Populated places established in 1838